Rodica Mateescu (born Rodica Petrescu on March 13, 1971 in Bucharest) is a former triple jumper from Romania. Having set a personal best of 15.16 in 1997, she placed fourth at the 1997 IAAF World Indoor Championships and won a silver medal at the 1997 World Championships. The same year she placed third at the Grand Prix Final in Fukuoka.

External links

1971 births
Living people
Sportspeople from Bucharest
Romanian female triple jumpers
Athletes (track and field) at the 1996 Summer Olympics
Olympic athletes of Romania
World Athletics Championships medalists